Yongjing is a county in Linxia Hui Autonomous Prefecture in China's Gansu Province. The county seat, the town (zhen) of Liujiaxia,  is located about 80 km south-west from the provincial capital city, Lanzhou. As is the case with most Chinese county seats, Liujiaxia Town is labeled on most less-detailed maps simply as "Yongjing" or "Yongjing County".

The Liujiaxia Dam on the Yellow River is located on the eastern outskirts of Liujiaxia Town.

History
Yongjing's history goes back approximately 5000 years. It was part of the ancient Western Qiang state. In the Han Dynasty it was part of Jincheng or Gold City. For many dynasties after that, it was part of Hezhou. Not until 1928 did it become part of Linxia.

Administrative divisions
Yongjing County is divided to 10 towns and 7 townships.
Towns

Townships

Geography
Yongjing is located in center western Gansu province along the Yellow River, north of the Liujiaxia Reservoir, or Bingling Lake. Yongjing County's area covers more than 1,863 km². It is mountainous and hilly with elevations between 1560–2851 m above sea-level and is located between 35°47'-36°12'N and 102°53'-103°39'E.

Climate

Economy
Yongjing's economy is based mainly on the Yellow River and the hydropower it and its tributaries provide. The 3 local dams are Liujiaxia (located just upstream from the county seat), Yanguoxia (upstream from Yanguoxia Town, further north), and Bapanxia (actually located within the Lanzhou prefecture, but with much of its reservoir being in Yongjing County).

With beautiful natural scenery and the famous Bingling Temple nearby, tourism is growing. Agriculture, mining, fishing, and other natural resource related industries are also important.

Transport 

China National Highway 213

Tourism
Bingling Temple is located in the southern part of Yongjing County, a 3-hour boat ride away (upstream) from Liujiaxia Dam.  Most boats start from just next to the dam, although some private boats also take tourists to the temple from the Lianhua Tai ferry dock on the southern (Linxia County) side of the Liujiaxia Reservoir.
In order to improve foreign tourism, the local government has introduced foreign teachers to improve the English of the locality and social awareness of foreigners.

In 2001 archaeologists discovered more than 100 dinosaur tracks on a  hillside near Yangouxia Gorge, and a dinosaur themed park was built but closed down in 2010.

References

External links

Official Website 

Linxia Hui Autonomous Prefecture